Nutec AS is a Norwegian company working with security and preparedness for emergency exits, fire on oil rigs. Among the activities are education for oil rig workers.

External links 
 Nutec homepage

Business services companies of Norway
Occupational safety and health